The General Juan Pablo Peñaloza National Park Also Páramos Batallón y La Negra National Park Is a national park of Venezuela that is formed by several páramos: Among them Batallón and La Negra, which are an important source of water supply. It is located between the states Mérida and Táchira, northwest of the Táchira depression in the Páramos de El Batallón and La Negra in Venezuela.

The rivers Uribante, Escalante, La Grita, Mocotíes, El Molino, Torbes, Orope, Umuquena, Bobo, Pereña and Quebrada Grande and the waters that feed the Uribante-Caparo hydroelectric complex are born here.

It is a set of mountain ranges with elevations ranging from 1800 to 3942 masl at the summit of its peak El Pulpito, the highest in the Táchira state, in addition to more than 130 periglacial lagoons of various sizes. The park has a very rugged relief, with steep slopes where in some sectors the glaciers are observed. Among its largest lagoons are the lagoon of Bobo river or Babu, the Grande, Verde, Negra, large hole, Piedra, etc. Among many others without officially cataloging.

Gallery

See also
List of national parks of Venezuela
Canaima National Park

References

National parks of Venezuela
Protected areas established in 1989
1989 establishments in Venezuela
Geography of Mérida (state)
Geography of Táchira
Tourist attractions in Mérida (state)
Tourist attractions in Táchira